René Wiedmer (18 November 1936 – 12 April 2013) was a Swiss field hockey player. He competed in the men's tournament at the 1960 Summer Olympics.

References

External links
 

1936 births
2013 deaths
Swiss male field hockey players
Olympic field hockey players of Switzerland
Field hockey players at the 1960 Summer Olympics
People from Olten
Sportspeople from the canton of Solothurn